Cecil Valdeavilla Mamiit (born June 27, 1976) is a former tennis player from the United States who went on to represent the Philippines. He began his professional career in 1996 and reached his highest individual ranking in the ATP Tour on October 11, 1999 as World No. 72.

In 1996, he won the NCAA singles championship as an USC freshman, a feat that had not been achieved since John McEnroe attended Stanford University in 1978.

Mamiit won the silver medal in the men's tournament at the 1999 Pan American Games in Winnipeg, Manitoba, Canada, after losing the final to fellow American Paul Goldstein. At the 2006 Asian Games held in Doha, Qatar, he won bronze in the singles event after losing in the semifinals to Lee Hyung Taik of South Korea. In the doubles event, he also won bronze, along with fellow Filipino-American tennis player Eric Taino, losing to the first-seeded and former World no. 1 doubles players Mahesh Bhupathi and Leander Paes of India. He won the men's singles in the Ojai Tennis Tournament in 2008.

His best tournament result came at the 1999 San Jose tournament.  As a qualifier he defeated Danish Kenneth Carlsen, Americans Andre Agassi (although Agassi was up 6–0, 6–6 before he defaulted), Australian Mark Woodforde, and another American Michael Chang before losing in the final to another Aussie Mark Philippoussis 6–3, 6–2.

Mamiit represented the Philippines Davis Cup team, where he was undefeated until 2008.

From January 2011 through the clay court season, he was the hitting partner for Russian Maria Sharapova, where she won the 2012 French Open to complete her Career Grand Slam.

ATP career finals

Singles: 1 (1 runner-up)

ATP Challenger and ITF Futures finals

Singles: 17 (9–8)

Doubles: 18 (10–8)

Performance timelines

Singles

Doubles

References

External links
 List of NCAA Men's Tennis Champions
 
 
 

1976 births
Living people
American male tennis players
American sportspeople of Filipino descent
Filipino male tennis players
Filipino people of American descent
Tennis players from Los Angeles
Tennis players at the 1999 Pan American Games
USC Trojans men's tennis players
Asian Games medalists in tennis
Tennis players at the 2006 Asian Games
Tennis players at the 2010 Asian Games
Pan American Games silver medalists for the United States
Asian Games bronze medalists for the Philippines
Medalists at the 2006 Asian Games
Pan American Games medalists in tennis
Southeast Asian Games gold medalists for the Philippines
Southeast Asian Games silver medalists for the Philippines
Southeast Asian Games bronze medalists for the Philippines
Southeast Asian Games medalists in tennis
NCAA Division I tennis championships
NCAA Division I Tennis Championships
NCAA Division I Tennis Championships
Competitors at the 2005 Southeast Asian Games
Competitors at the 2007 Southeast Asian Games
Competitors at the 2009 Southeast Asian Games
Competitors at the 2011 Southeast Asian Games
Medalists at the 1999 Pan American Games